Sagittal sinus may refer to:
 Superior sagittal sinus
 Inferior sagittal sinus